Rynardt Ian van Wyk (born 6 March 1991 in Rustenburg, South Africa) is a South African rugby union player for French Fédérale 1 side Trélissac. His regular position is flanker or number eight.

Career

Youth and Varsity Cup rugby

As a scholar at Merensky High School in Tzaneen, Van Wyk was selected in the  Under-16 squad for the Grant Khomo Week competition in 2007 and for their Under-18 Craven Week squad in 2009.

In 2010, he joined the Zululand Rugby Academy and played for the  side in the 2010 Under-19 Provincial Championship, making twelve appearances. Van Wyk was one of the players that made this move and he represented the  side in the 2011 and 2012 Under-21 Provincial Championships.

He also made one appearance for Johannesburg-based university side  in the 2014 Varsity Cup competition.

Border Bulldogs

After reverting to the  side for the latter half of the 2012 season, he returned to the first team for the 2013 Vodacom Cup, making seven appearances. He remained in the first team for the remainder of the campaign, starting a further ten matches.

He started all six matches of the ' 2014 Currie Cup qualification campaign as finished bottom of the log to earn a place in the 2014 Currie Cup First Division competition.

References

External links

South African rugby union players
Living people
1991 births
People from Rustenburg
Rugby union flankers
Rugby union number eights
Border Bulldogs players
Rugby union players from North West (South African province)